Qo Xiong may refer to:
Qo Xiong language
Qo Xiong people